The Great Hypnotist is a 2014 Chinese mystery-thriller film directed by Leste Chen and starring Xu Zheng and Karen Mok. The film was released on April 29, 2014.

Plot
Dr. Ruining Xu is a prominent psychiatrist who uses psychotherapy to treat his patients. His mentor, Professor Fang recommends a patient, Xiaoyan Ren who claims she can see ghosts. Ruining agrees to treat Xiaoyen, despite learning from his colleague who once treated her that there is something disturbing about her.

During his session with Xiaoyen, Ruining quickly learns that she is lying to him. By contacting a friend who works at child services, Ruining learns that Xiaoyen was actually abandoned by her adoptive parents after her adoptive mother became pregnant. She was then taken in by a foster family. However, Ruining realizes she is not actually lying, but had suppressed her darkest memories by making stories up.

A game of cat and mouse continues where Dr. Ruining tries to disproves Xiaoyan's made up stories by the proof he obtains. However things change when Xiaoyan tells Ruining that she has been seeing two people, a man and a woman, in his chambers since she arrived. After sometime Ruining open up about the car crash into river which he was driving and resulted in death of his lover and best friend. Xiaoyan tells him that ghosts have forgiven him and want him to remember their forgiveness as he wakes up. Ruining crashes on the floor as his assistant runs to take care of him.

It is revealed that Xiaoyan Ren was working with Professor Fang, Ruining's family and his staff to cure Ruining of post traumatic guilt out of which Ruining had tried to commit suicide. Professor Fang had carefully crafted this plan selecting her best student Xiaoyan Ren who was also Ruining's classmate. After Ruining is awake everyone except Xiaoyan Ren goes to see him and in flashback it is revealed, Ruining's best friend who was also killed in car accident, was Xiaoyan's fiancé. Professor Fang tells Xiaoyan that she must also let it go.

Xiaoyan and Ruining had a moment together where Xiaoyan confesses that she did not want to be cured.

Cast
 Xu Zheng as Xu Ruining
 Karen Mok as Ren Xiaoyan
 Hu Jing
 Lü Zhong
 Wang Yaoqing

Reception
The film reached US$44,070,000 at the Chinese box office. It earned a total of  internationally.

References

External links
 

2014 films
2010s Mandarin-language films
Chinese mystery thriller films
2010s mystery thriller films
Films directed by Leste Chen